10UNDER2 is an EP by Jaymay. Each of the ten songs on this EP is less than two minutes long, giving the EP its title.

"Climb Up The Ladder" is the theme song of the 2012 political drama series Chasing The Hill.

Track listing
All songs written by Jaymay except where indicated
 "Lamb" – 1:58
 "Sebi5" – 1:38 (Music by Sébastien Debande, words by Jaymay)
 "What About The Bob?" – 1:29
 "Climb Up The Ladder" – 1:57
 "Pinocchio's Demise" – 1:53
 "Solitaire" – 1:51
 "Eye2Eye" – 1:37
 "WASAD" – 1:21
 "Niagara Falls" – 1:59
 "Hyenas Go Ha, Owls Go Who? – 1:36

Personnel
Musicians
Jaymay – All instruments except:
Mike Block – Cello on 4
Sébastien Debande – Guitar and vox on 2
Steve Lewis – Bass on 4, 5, 6 and 9; Bongos on 5; Lap steel on 5 and 6
Patrick MacDougall – Trumpet on 10
Reed Seerman – Bass on 1

Production
Jaymay – Producer, Artwork
Patrick MacDougall – Mixing
Robert Vosgien – Mastering
Kazutaka Noda – Translation

References

2012 EPs
Jaymay albums